Sayed Ahmad Haqbeen  (born 1953) is the former deputy and acting minister of Ministry of Borders and Tribal Affairs of Afghanistan, and a former governor of Kapisa Province. He was elected as the Acting minister of Ministry of Border & Tribal Affairs on 31 December 2014.He previously served as the deputy minister of Ministry of Border Affairs and as the Governor of Kapisa Province. >

Political career
Haqbeen served as a negotiator for the Afghan Northern Alliance delegation to the Bonn conference on Afghanistan in Bonn, Germany.
According to the list of participants announced by the United Nations on 27 November 2001, Mr. Haqbeen was one of the 26 participants representing United National Front. 
According to Radio Free Europe/Radio Liberty poppy cultivation was on rise in Kapisa Province during his governorship.

Wikileaks cables 
In the WikiLeaks cables released in 2005, Haqbeen was cited as one of the officials in Afghanistan.

References

Kapisa Governor Website 
Ministry of Border & Tribal Affairs
Dr.Haqbeen Biography

Bakhtar News

1953 births
Government ministers of Afghanistan
Governors of Kapisa Province
Living people